Alexander Mullen (born 13 June 1992) is an Australian professional footballer who plays as a midfielder for Para Hills Knights SC.

Personal life
Mullen is the brother of Matthew, cousin of former Newcastle Jets player Daniel Mullen and the nephew of Joe Mullen, a former Socceroo.

Club career

Sydney FC
Sydney FC signed Mullen on a one-year deal as a mature age rookie ahead of the 2015–16 season after trialling him in the pre-season.

On 16 March 2016, Mullen debuted for Sydney FC in their AFC Champions League campaign coming on as a substitute for George Blackwood late in the match.

Mullen made his A-League debut for Sydney FC in their round 26 match against Adelaide United on 2 April 2016.

After a season where he played one league match, and was twice subbed on in the AFC Champions League, Mullen was not offered a new contract.

See also
 List of association football families
 List of Sydney FC players (fewer than 25 appearances)

References

External links
 

1992 births
Living people
Association football midfielders
Australian soccer players
Soccer players from Adelaide
Mars Hill University alumni
Para Hills Knights players
Sydney FC players
Campbelltown City SC players
A-League Men players